The following is a list (of lists) of United States Marine Corps equipment;

See the following articles;
 List of weapons of the United States Marine Corps
 List of vehicles of the United States Marine Corps
 List of active aircraft of the United States Marine Corps
 List of United States Marine Corps individual equipment
 Uniforms of the United States Marine Corps
 Badges of the United States Marine Corps
 Fleet Marine Force insignia

See also
 United States Marine Corps
 Equipment of the United States Armed Forces
 Equipment of the United States Navy
 Equipment of the United States Air Force
 Equipment of the United States Army
 Equipment of the United States Coast Guard

References

External links
 USMC official website

United States Marine Corps
United States Marine Corps equipment
United States Marine Corps